In functional analysis (a branch of mathematics), a reproducing kernel Hilbert space (RKHS) is a Hilbert space of functions in which point evaluation is a continuous linear functional. The converse does not need to be true. Informally, this can be shown by looking at the supremum norm: the sequence of functions  converges pointwise, but do not converge uniformly i.e. do not converge with respect to the supremum norm (this is not a counterexample because the supremum norm does not arise from any inner product due to not satisfying the parallelogram law).

It is not entirely straightforward to construct a Hilbert space of functions which is not an RKHS. Some examples, however, have been found.

However, there are RKHSs in which the norm is an L2-norm, such as the space of band-limited functions (see the example below).

An RKHS is associated with a kernel that reproduces every function in the space in the sense that for every  in the set on which the functions are defined, "evaluation at " can be performed by taking an inner product with a function determined by the kernel. Such a reproducing kernel exists if and only if every evaluation functional is continuous.

The reproducing kernel was first introduced in the 1907 work of Stanisław Zaremba concerning boundary value problems for harmonic and biharmonic functions.  James Mercer simultaneously examined functions which satisfy the reproducing property in the theory of integral equations. The idea of the reproducing kernel remained untouched for nearly twenty years until it appeared in the dissertations of Gábor Szegő, Stefan Bergman, and Salomon Bochner.  The subject was eventually systematically developed in the early 1950s by Nachman Aronszajn and Stefan Bergman.

These spaces have wide applications, including complex analysis, harmonic analysis, and quantum mechanics.  Reproducing kernel Hilbert spaces are particularly important in the field of statistical learning theory because of the celebrated representer theorem which states that every function in an RKHS that minimises an empirical risk functional can be written as a linear combination of the kernel function evaluated at the training points.  This is a practically useful result as it effectively simplifies the empirical risk minimization problem from an infinite dimensional to a finite dimensional optimization problem.

For ease of understanding, we provide the framework for real-valued Hilbert spaces.  The theory can be easily extended to spaces of complex-valued functions and hence include the many important examples of reproducing kernel Hilbert spaces that are spaces of analytic functions.

Definition
The evaluation functional over the Hilbert space of functions  is a linear functional that evaluates each function at a point ,

Although  is assumed for all , it might still be the case that .

This function is the so-called reproducing kernel for the Hilbert space  from which the RKHS takes its name.

Example
The space of bandlimited continuous functions  is a RKHS, as we now show.  Formally, fix some cutoff frequency  and define the Hilbert space

As the inner product of this Hilbert space, we use

 

From the Fourier inversion theorem, we have

It then follows by the Cauchy–Schwarz inequality and Plancherel's theorem that, for all ,

This inequality shows that the evaluation functional is bounded, proving that  is indeed a RKHS.

The kernel function  in this case is given by

The Fourier transform of  defined above is given by

which is a consequence of the time-shifting property of the Fourier transform. Consequently, using Plancherel's theorem, we have

Thus we obtain the reproducing property of the kernel.

Moore–Aronszajn theorem 
We have seen how a reproducing kernel Hilbert space defines a reproducing kernel function that is both symmetric and positive definite. The Moore–Aronszajn theorem goes in the other direction; it states that every symmetric, positive definite kernel defines a unique reproducing kernel Hilbert space. The theorem first appeared in Aronszajn's Theory of Reproducing Kernels, although he attributes it to E. H. Moore.

Theorem. Suppose K is a symmetric, positive definite kernel on a set X. Then there is a unique Hilbert space of functions on X for which K is a reproducing kernel.

Proof. For all x in X, define Kx = K(x, ⋅ ). Let H0 be the linear span of {Kx : x ∈ X}. Define an inner product on H0 by

which implies .
The symmetry of this inner product follows from the symmetry of K and the non-degeneracy follows from the fact that K is positive definite.

Let H be the completion of H0 with respect to this inner product. Then H consists of functions of the form

Now we can check the reproducing property:

To prove uniqueness, let G be another Hilbert space of functions for which K is a reproducing kernel. For every x and y in X, implies that

Then  because G is complete and contains H0 and hence contains its completion.

Now if  then, since K is a reproducing kernel of G and H:

This shows that  in G and concludes the proof.

Integral operators and Mercer's theorem
We may characterize a symmetric positive definite kernel  via the integral operator using Mercer's theorem and obtain an additional view of the RKHS. Let  be a compact space equipped with a strictly positive finite Borel measure  and  a continuous, symmetric, and positive definite function. Define the integral operator  as

This then implies that  is a reproducing kernel so that the corresponding RKHS can be defined in terms of these eigenvalues and eigenfunctions. We provide the details below.

Under these assumptions  is a compact, continuous, self-adjoint, and positive operator.  The spectral theorem for self-adjoint operators implies that there is an at most countable decreasing sequence  such that  and

for all  such that

where the inner product of  given by

This representation of the RKHS has application in probability and statistics, for example  to the Karhunen-Loève representation for stochastic processes and kernel PCA.

Feature maps
A feature map is a map , where  is a Hilbert space which we will call the feature space.  The first sections presented the connection between bounded/continuous evaluation functions, positive definite functions, and integral operators and in this section we provide another representation of the RKHS in terms of feature maps.

Every feature map defines a kernel via

Conversely, every positive definite function and corresponding reproducing kernel Hilbert space has infinitely many associated feature maps such that holds.

Then is satisfied by the reproducing property.

Moreover, every feature map can naturally define a RKHS by means of the definition of a positive definite function.

Lastly, feature maps allow us to construct function spaces that reveal another perspective on the RKHS.  Consider the linear space

This representation implies that the elements of the RKHS are inner products of elements in the feature space and can accordingly be seen as hyperplanes. This view of the RKHS is related to the kernel trick in machine learning.

Properties

The following properties of RKHSs may be useful to readers.

 Let  be a sequence of sets and  be a collection of corresponding positive definite functions on  It then follows that

is a kernel on 
 Consider a normalized kernel  such that  for all . Define a pseudo-metric on X as

By the Cauchy–Schwarz inequality,

This inequality allows us to view  as a measure of similarity between inputs. If  are similar then  will be closer to 1 while if  are dissimilar then  will be closer to 0.

Common examples

Bilinear kernels

The RKHS  corresponding to this kernel is the dual space, consisting of functions  satisfying .

Polynomial kernels

Radial basis function kernels 
These are another common class of kernels which satisfy . Some examples include:

Gaussian or squared exponential kernel:

 Laplacian kernel:

The squared norm of a function  in the RKHS  with this kernel is:

Bergman kernels

We also provide examples of Bergman kernels. Let X be finite and let H consist of all complex-valued functions on X.  Then an element of H can be represented as an array of complex numbers. If the usual inner product is used, then Kx is the function whose value is 1 at x and 0 everywhere else, and  can be thought of as an identity matrix since

Extension to vector-valued functions
In this section we extend the definition of the RKHS to spaces of vector-valued functions as this extension is particularly important in multi-task learning and manifold regularization. More formally, we define a vector-valued RKHS (vvRKHS) as a Hilbert space of functions  such that for all  and 

and

This second property parallels the reproducing property for the scalar-valued case. This definition can also be connected to integral operators, bounded evaluation functions, and feature maps as we saw for the scalar-valued RKHS. We can equivalently define the vvRKHS as a vector-valued Hilbert space with a bounded evaluation functional and show that this implies the existence of a unique reproducing kernel by the Riesz Representation theorem. Mercer's theorem can also be extended to address the vector-valued setting and we can therefore obtain a feature map view of the vvRKHS.

We can gain intuition for the vvRKHS by taking a component-wise perspective on these spaces.  In particular, we find that every vvRKHS is isometrically isomorphic to a scalar-valued RKHS on a particular input space. Let .  Consider the space  and the corresponding reproducing kernel

As noted above, the RKHS associated to this reproducing kernel is given by the closure of the span of  where 
 for every set of pairs 

The connection to the scalar-valued RKHS can then be made by the fact that every matrix-valued kernel can be identified with a kernel of the form of  via

Moreover, every kernel with the form of  defines a matrix-valued kernel with the above expression.  Now letting the map  be defined as

While this view of the vvRKHS can be useful in multi-task learning, this isometry does not reduce the study of the vector-valued case to that of the scalar-valued case.  In fact, this isometry procedure can make both the scalar-valued kernel and the input space too difficult to work with in practice as properties of the original kernels are often lost.

An important class of matrix-valued reproducing kernels are separable kernels which can factorized as the product of a scalar valued kernel and a -dimensional symmetric positive semi-definite matrix.  In light of our previous discussion these kernels are of the form

As the scalar-valued kernel encodes dependencies between the inputs, we can observe that the matrix-valued kernel encodes dependencies among both the inputs and the outputs.

We lastly remark that the above theory can be further extended to spaces of functions with values in function spaces but obtaining kernels for these spaces is a more difficult task.

Connection between RKHS with ReLU function  
One can construct a ReLU-like nonlinear function using the theory of reproducing kernel Hilbert spaces. Below, we derive this construction and show how it implies the representation power of neural networks with ReLU activations. 

It has the inner product 

 

The Fundamental Theorem of Calculus then gives 

 

where

 

and  i.e.

This implies  reproduces .

Moreover the minimum function on  has the following representations with the ReLu function: 

 

Using this formulation, we can apply the representer theorem to the RKHS, letting one prove the optimality of using ReLU activations in neural network settings.

See also 
Positive definite kernel
Mercer's theorem
Kernel trick
Kernel embedding of distributions
Representer theorem

Notes

References
Alvarez, Mauricio, Rosasco, Lorenzo and Lawrence, Neil, “Kernels for Vector-Valued Functions: a Review,” https://arxiv.org/abs/1106.6251, June 2011.
 
 Berlinet, Alain and Thomas, Christine. Reproducing kernel Hilbert spaces in Probability and Statistics, Kluwer Academic Publishers, 2004.
 
De Vito, Ernest, Umanita, Veronica, and Villa, Silvia. "An extension of Mercer theorem to vector-valued measurable kernels," , June 2013.
Durrett, Greg.  9.520 Course Notes, Massachusetts Institute of Technology, https://www.mit.edu/~9.520/scribe-notes/class03_gdurett.pdf, February 2010.
 
Okutmustur, Baver.   “Reproducing Kernel Hilbert Spaces,” M.S. dissertation, Bilkent University, http://www.thesis.bilkent.edu.tr/0002953.pdf, August 2005.
Paulsen, Vern. “An introduction to the theory of reproducing kernel Hilbert spaces,” http://www.math.uh.edu/~vern/rkhs.pdf.
 
 Rosasco, Lorenzo and Poggio, Thomas.  "A Regularization Tour of Machine Learning – MIT 9.520 Lecture Notes" Manuscript, Dec. 2014.
 Wahba, Grace,  Spline Models for Observational Data, SIAM, 1990.

Hilbert space